Cytochrome c oxidase subunit 5B, mitochondrial is an enzyme in humans that is a subunit of the cytochrome c oxidase complex, also known as Complex IV, the last enzyme in the mitochondrial electron transport chain. In humans, cytochrome c oxidase subunit 5B is encoded by the COX5B gene.

Structure 

The enzyme weighs 14 kDa and is composed of 129 amino acids. The protein is a subunit of Complex IV, which consists of 13 mitochondrial- and nuclear-encoded subunits. The sequence of subunit Vb is well conserved and includes three conserved cysteines that coordinate the zinc ion. Two of these cysteines are clustered in the C-terminal section of the subunit.

Gene 

The COX5B gene, located on the q arm of chromosome 2 in position 11.2, is made up of 4 exons and is 2,137 base pairs in length.

Function 

Cytochrome c oxidase (COX) is the terminal enzyme of the mitochondrial respiratory chain. It is a multi-subunit enzyme complex that couples the transfer of electrons from cytochrome c to oxygen and contributes to a proton electrochemical gradient across the inner mitochondrial membrane to drive ATP synthesis via protonmotive force.  The mitochondrially-encoded subunits perform the electron transfer of proton pumping activities. The functions of the nuclear-encoded subunits are unknown but they may play a role in the regulation and assembly of the complex.

Summary reaction:
 4 Fe2+-cytochrome c + 8 H+in + O2 → 4 Fe3+-cytochrome c + 2 H2O + 4 H+out

Clinical significance

COX5A and COX5B are involved in the regulation of cancer cell metabolism by Bcl-2.

The Trans-activator of transcription protein (Tat) of human immunodeficiency virus (HIV) inhibits cytochrome c oxidase (COX) activity in permeabilized mitochondria isolated from both mouse and human liver, heart, and brain samples.

Interactions 

COX5B has been shown to interact with Androgen receptor.

References

Further reading

External links 
 
 Mass spectrometry characterization of COX5B at COPaKB
 Cytochrome c oxidase subunit Vb in PROSITE
 

Enzymes